Saša Kocić (Serbian Cyrillic: Саша Коцић; born 10 June 1976) is a Serbian football midfielder playing with Zvižd Kučevo in the Serbian League West.

During his career, Kocić played for Mladi Radnik, Crvena Zvezda, Smederevo, Bežanija, Borac Čačak, Radnički Kragujevac and Union Ardagger.

Career statistics

References

1976 births
Living people
Serbian footballers
Association football midfielders
FK Mladi Radnik players
Red Star Belgrade footballers
FK Smederevo players
FK Bežanija players
FK Borac Čačak players
FK Radnički 1923 players
Serbian SuperLiga players
Serbian expatriate footballers
Expatriate footballers in Austria